is a Japanese professional football player currently playing for J1 League team Oita Trinita. After working his way through the S-Pulse youth system, he signed full professional terms in 2007.   He spent loan spells at J. League 2 sides Roasso Kumamoto, Kyoto Sanga and Matsumoto Yamaga before signing with Gamba Osaka in July 2015.

Career statistics

Honours

Gamba Osaka
 Emperor's Cup: 2015

Individual Performance
 J1 MVP August 2016

References

External links

1988 births
Living people
Association football people from Shizuoka Prefecture
Japanese footballers
J1 League players
J2 League players
J3 League players
Shimizu S-Pulse players
Roasso Kumamoto players
Kyoto Sanga FC players
Matsumoto Yamaga FC players
Gamba Osaka players
Gamba Osaka U-23 players
Vissel Kobe players
Vegalta Sendai players
Oita Trinita players
Association football forwards